City of God is a 2011 Indian Malayalam-language crime thriller film directed by Lijo Jose Pellissery and written by Babu Janardhanan. It tells the story of Tamil migrant workers and a team of land mafia criminals in the city of Cochin, Kerala, India. It stars Prithviraj Sukumaran, Indrajith Sukumaran, Rajeev Pillai, Rohini, Parvathy Thiruvothu, Rima Kallingal and Swetha Menon.

The film uses the hyperlink cinema format as its narrative structure, a technique first used by Satyajit Ray in his Kanchenjungha (1962). City of God is not a remake and shares no resemblance to the 2002 Brazilian film of the same name, although both use non-linear narrative structure. The film was subsequently dubbed and released in Hindi under the same name by Wide Angle Media in 2014.

City of God was one of the first among the "Malayalam New Wave" movies, although the trend was just becoming recognised during 2011. Despite getting critical acclaim, the movie was an average hit at the box-office.

Plot
City of God starts with a road accident and the story traces the life of the four families who are associated with the accident. Each family has a different perspective on the city of Cochin.

The first story revolves around the life of Tamil migrants. One of them, Swarnavel, has a special affection towards another migrant, Marakatham. Marakatham was already married but she had run away from her old husband in Pollachi due to his unbearable torture. Marakatham and Swarnavel know that they love each other, but they don't show it. Because of some personal benefits, Lakshmi breaks their relationship and forces Marakatham to marry another migrant. But on the night of the marriage, Marakatham learns that her new husband is a thief and returns to Swarnavel. They realize that their love is mutual and start living together. The second husband, stricken with envy, takes revenge by bringing the first husband (a rowdy) from Pollachi. The following day, Swarnavel rescues Marakatham from her old husband and tries to escape on a moped; they have an accident.

The next story deals with the life of real estate dealer Sony and his forehand Jyothi Lal. As per the instructions of Sony, Jyothi Lal and his gang kill a plot owner, who is the husband of Viji Punnose. Viji Punnosse identifies her husband's murderer as Jyothi Lal and associates with another businessman, Shamir, plot revenge and destroy Sony and Jyothi Lal. Viji promises to marry Shamir if he can kill Jyothi Lal and Sony by arranging it with another gang.

Sony has an eye on the growing actress Surya Prabha. Surya is leading an unpleasant married life with Mehaboob, who is a friend and later business partner of Sony. Sony, with the intention of collecting Surya Prabha, cheats Mehaboob in the construction business; the police remand Mehaboob for the inadequate and unsafe construction practices which had caused the death of the Tamil migrant Lakshmi. Sony forces Surya to have an illicit relation to get the papers that prove her husband's innocence. Jyothi Lal rescues Surya from this predicament. Later in the story, he rescues her from a suicide attempt. Jyothi Lal takes Surya to Sony's guest house to collect the papers and they pick up Sony on the way. However, their vehicle is in the same accident which Swarnavel and Marathakam had. Sony dies at the scene of the accident.

The gang arranged by Shamir and Viji Punnoose arrives at the accident and tries to kill Jyothi Lal, too. Jyothi Lal escapes with Surya and they began to realise the importance of each other in their future life. Viji marries Shamir and goes to Dubai for further business.

In the final scene, Swarnavel and Marathakam marry each other and settle in a scenic village with Marathakam's son, living happily ever after.

Cast

Music
Prashant Pillai scored both background and songs. Three songs are in Tamil, two in Malayalam and one in Hindi. The background score is known for its experimental approach and its dark theme; it received wide attention from critics and moviegoers alike.

Release and critical reception
The film had a delayed release on 23 April 2011. It received predominantly positive reviews from critics. Veeyen of Nowrunning.com said , "City of God is no City of Dreams. It's a raw and bleeding city that wails all night and day. A city where en eternal eclipse has cast a shadow over the rights and wrongs. A city where God has apparently deserted his illusory throne and vanished without a trace." Indiaglitz said , City of God is a movie with feelings and appeal for the proponents of differently made experimental cinema. Director Lijo, Anil Mathew and their crew needs to be applauded for the efforts in keeping away cliches and commercial thrusts on the narrative structure, though they may find it a little difficult to cruise in the box-office." Rediff said , "The narrative keeps moving back and forth, with scenes being repeated from various angles denoting the point of view of the characters or telling the back story of the main players. The pace is meditative and taxing for the lay viewer, who has been spoon-fed with every development in the plot being underscored by dialogues or background music. But here the viewer is required to invest his intellect and undivided attention to grasp the proceedings... Overall, City of God is a good watch when compared to the senseless stuff we have endured in this holiday season."

References

External links

 

2010s Malayalam-language films
2011 crime thriller films
2011 films
Indian gangster films
Indian crime thriller films
Hyperlink films
Indian nonlinear narrative films
Films about organised crime in India
Films shot in Kochi
Films directed by Lijo Jose Pellissery